Nimmo may refer to:

 Nimmo, Somalia, town
 Nimmo (film), a 1984 Punjabi film
 Nimmo (surname), people with the surname Nimmo
 The Nimmo Twins, English comedy duo (Owen Evans and Carl Minns)
 Nimmo (band), British electronic music duo

See also 
 Nimo (disambiguation)